Rogelio Matira (born January 24, 1968), better known by his stage name Simon Ibarra is a Filipino actor.

Ibarra appeared in movies like Soltera (1999) starring Maricel Soriano, and Live Show (2000) with Ana Capri and Klaudia Koronel.

He also appeared on ABS-CBN TV series Tayong Dalawa (2009) with Gerald Anderson and Jake Cuenca, and My Binondo Girl (2011) topbilled by Kim Chiu. He was also included in the cast of TV5's Babaeng Hampaslupa (2011) starring Susan Roces, Alice Dixson and Alex Gonzaga. He played a special role in Maria Mercedes (2013) starring Jessy Mendiola, and Ikaw Lamang (2014) topbilled by Coco Martin. 

He played the role of Kapitan Domeng Jacinto (2019) in Starla and as the main antagonist, Caesar Augusto, of Ang sa Iyo ay Akin (2020).

Ibarra also did Indie movies like Kadin (2007), Tirador (2007), 100 (2008), Bakal Boys (2009), Si Baning, Si Maymay, At Ang Asong Si Bobo (2009), Ligo na Ü, Lapit na Me (2011), Cuchera (2011), Culion (2019).

Ibarra received the Gawad Urian Award Best Supporting Actor nomination for his performance in Live Show (2000).

Filmography

Television

Film
U-Turn (2020)
Boy Golden: Shoot to Kill, the Arturo Porcuna Story (2013)
Gabriel: Ito Ang Kwento Ko (2013)
The Healing (film) (2012)
Bola (2012)
Ligo na Ü, Lapit na Me (2011)
Cuchera (2011)
Dampi (2010)
Vox Populi (2010)
Fling (2010)
Ben & Sam (2010)
Si Baning, Si Maymay, At Ang Asong Si Bobo (2009)
Bakal Boys (2009)
Binyag (2008)
Project X (2008)
100 (2008)
Bahay Kubo: A Pinoy Mano Po! (2007)
The Inmate (2007)
Drumbeat (2007)
Slingshot (2007)
Siquijor: Mystic Island (2007)
Heremias: Unang Aklat - Ang Alamat Ng Prinsesang Bayawak (2006)
Donsol (2006)
Rotonda (2006)
Inter.m@tes (2004)
Biyahera (2002)
Biglang Liko (2002)
Minsan May Isang Puso (2001)
Arayyy! (2000)
Madame X (2000)
Live Show (2000)
Sa Paraiso ni Efren (1999)
Favorite Subject: Sex Education (1999)
Soltera (1999)
Campus Scandal (1998)
Dama De Noche (1998)
Kung Liligaya Ka Sa Piling Ng Iba (1998)

References

External links

1968 births
Living people
Filipino male film actors
Filipino male television actors
Actors from Batangas